Towaoc is a Census-designated place (CDP), a post office, and the capital of the Ute Mountain Ute Tribe located on the Ute Mountain Ute Reservation in Montezuma County, Colorado, United States. The Towaoc post office has the ZIP Code 81334 (post office boxes). At the United States Census 2020, the population of the Towaoc CDP was 1,120.

Geography
Towaoc is located east of Sleeping Ute Mountain, a sacred mountain of the Ute people, and northeast of the Four Corners Monument.

In recent years, a small complex has been developed directly on US Highway 491-160 at the junction of the road into the original town. This includes the Ute Mountain Casino, Hotel & Resort, with a travel center (convenience store, food service, and fuel sales), campground, and the offices and shops for the Weeminuche Construction Authority (the Tribal construction company) and other facilities.

Demographics

See also

 List of census-designated places in Colorado

References

External links

 Towaoc @ Colorado.com
 Towaoc @ UncoverColorado.com
 Ute Mountain Ute Tribe website
 Ute Mountain Ute Tribal Park
 Ute Mountain Casino Hotel
 Montezuma County website

Census-designated places in Montezuma County, Colorado
Census-designated places in Colorado
Gambling localities in Colorado
Seats of government of American Indian reservations